Julius Lorenzo Cobb Bledsoe (December 29, 1898 – July 14, 1943) was an American baritone and one of the first African-American artists to gain regular employment on Broadway.

Early life and education
Jules Bledsoe was born Julius Lorenzo Cobb Bledsoe to Henry L. and Jessie Cobb Bledsoe in Waco, Texas in 1898. When Bledsoe's parents split in 1899, Julius went with his mother to live with the Cobb family. During his youth Bledsoe attended Central Texas Academy from 1905 to 1914. After graduating as valedictorian he studied at Bishop College where he earned his B.A. in 1918. He then attended Virginia Union College from 1918 to 1919, where he was a member of ROTC, and finally Columbia University, where he studied medicine from 1920 to 1924. Throughout his time in school, he studied music under Claude Warford, Luigi Parisotti, and Lazar Samoiloff.

Career
Bledsoe made his professional singing debut in New York's Aeolian Hall on April 20, 1924, with the sponsorship of impresario Sol Hurok. Over the course of his career he traveled throughout the United States and Europe performing, acting, and writing.

Opera and music
Bledsoe performed in many major operas and was in high demand due to his ability to sing in multiple languages as well as his impressive vocal range. In 1926 he appeared as Tizan in Frank Harling's opera Deep River, and he was the first to perform as Joe in Jerome Kern and Oscar Hammerstein II's Show Boat in 1927. His role in Show Boat became his best known role, and he popularized "Ol' Man River", a song from the musical.

In the Chicago Opera's production of Verdi's Aida, Bledsoe sang the role of Amonasro. In 1930, Bledsoe attempted to create an original musical setting of Eugene O'Neill's The Emperor Jones, but he lacked the permission of the playwright which was already secured by composer Louis Gruenberg. Though the honor went to Lawrence Tibbett to originate the title role in 1933, Bledsoe played the character in a production in Amsterdam in 1934, and later in Paris, Vienna, Brussels and London, and still later in New York City.  Bledsoe also performed the title character in Mussorgsky's Boris Godunov.

Bledsoe's only recording of Ol' Man River, which he sang in the original production of Show Boat, is occasionally played on the NPR musical theatre program, A Night on the Town. His rendition of the song, especially in comparison to those made famous by Paul Robeson, William Warfield (in the 1951 film version), Bruce Hubbard (on the 1988 three-disc EMI album), and Michel Bell (in the Harold Prince revival of the show), is somewhat melodramatic in the manner of early twentieth-century acting, and Bledsoe rolls all of his "r"'s, as a baritone might when singing his solos in an oratorio. A recently released album of vintage spiritual recordings features Bledsoe singing Swing Low, Sweet Chariot in that same style, which demonstrates that it was not unique to his performance of Ol' Man River. Bledsoe was also actually filmed singing the song - his rendition of it was included in the sound prologue to the part-talkie Show Boat (1929 film version).

Bledsoe wrote several songs and wrote a full opera, Bondage, in 1939.

Film
Between 1929 and 1930, Bledsoe appeared in three musical film Shorts - Old Man Trouble, On the Levee, and Dear Old Southland. He spent 1940 and 1941 working in Hollywood, and is credited with the part of Kalu in Drums of the Congo, and speculated to have acted in Safari, Western Union and Santa Fe Trail.

Partial filmography
 Drums of the Congo (1942)

Legacy and death
Bledsoe died in Hollywood, California, on July 14, 1943. He is buried in Greenwood Cemetery, a city-owned cemetery in Waco, Texas. His papers, including sheet music, photographs, and correspondence, are housed in The Texas Collection at Baylor University. The Bledsoe-Miller Community Center, a recreation facility in Waco, is jointly named for Bledsoe and Doris Miller.

References

Eileen Southern (ed.), The Music of Black Americans: A History, 3rd edition, W. W. Norton & Company.

External links

 Jules Bledsoe photo in The Texas Collection on Flickr
 

1898 births
1943 deaths
20th-century American composers
20th-century African-American male singers
20th-century American male opera singers
African-American male opera singers
African-American male classical composers
American male classical composers
African-American classical composers
American classical composers
American male musical theatre actors
American operatic baritones
Bishop College alumni
Classical musicians from Texas
Columbia University Vagelos College of Physicians and Surgeons alumni
People from Waco, Texas
Singers from Texas
Virginia Union University alumni